The United Baltic Duchy, or alternatively the Grand Duchy of Livonia, was the name proposed during World War I by leaders of the local Baltic German nobility for a new monarchical state that never came into existence. The  attempt to establish a new client state of the German Empire on the territory of what is now Latvia and Estonia was made in 1918, during the German occupation of the former Courland, Livonian and Estonian governorates of the Russian Empire which had ceased to exist after the Bolshevik coup in 1917. The unsuccessful proclamation of a pro-German duchy was first made in April 1918, after the Republic of Estonia had already formally declared full independence. 

The proposed ideas for the new state included the creation of a Duchy of Courland and Semigallia and of a Duchy of Estonia and Livonia, which would be in personal union with the Kingdom of Prussia.

Background 
During World War I, the German Imperial Army had occupied the Courland Governorate of the Russian Empire by the autumn of 1915. The front stabilised along the Riga–Daugavpils–Baranovichi Line.

After the October Revolution later that year, the elected Estonian Provincial Assembly declared itself the sovereign power in Estonia on 28 November 1917. On 24 February 1918, a day before the arrival of German troops, the Estonian Salvation Committee of the Provincial Assembly issued the Estonian Declaration of Independence. The Western Allies recognised the Republic of Estonia de facto in May 1918.

The term 'Grand Duchy of Livonia' refers to the Livonia region, which made up most of the proposed United Baltic Duchy.

The Latvian Provisional National Council was constituted on the basis of the law of self-government, which the Russian Provisional Government granted to Latvia on 5 July 1917. The Latvian Provisional National Council first met on 16 November 1917 in Valka. On 30 November, the Council declared an autonomous Latvian province within ethnographic boundaries, and a formal independent Latvian republic was declared on 15 January 1918.

In early 1918, German troops started advancing from Courland, and by the end of February 1918, the German military administered the territories of Estonia that had declared independence and the Russian Governorate of Livonia. In the Treaty of Brest-Litovsk on 3 March 1918, Soviet Russia accepted the loss of the Courland Governorate and, in agreements concluded in Berlin on 27 August 1918, the loss of the Autonomous Governorate of Estonia and the Governorate of Livonia.

Attempt at creation 

As a parallel political movement under the German military administration, Baltic Germans began forming provincial councils between September 1917 and March 1918. 

On 8 March 1918, the local Baltic German-dominated  declared the restoration of Duchy of Courland, which was formally recognised by Kaiser Wilhelm on 15 March 1918.

On 12 April 1918, a Provincial Assembly, composed of 35 Baltic Germans, 13 Estonians, and 11 Latvians, passed a resolution calling upon the German Emperor to recognise the Baltic provinces as a monarchy and to make them a German protectorate.

The United Baltic Duchy was nominally recognised as a sovereign state by Wilhelm II only on 22 September 1918, half a year after Soviet Russia had formally relinquished all authority over former Russian Imperial Baltic governorates to Germany in the Treaty of Brest-Litovsk. On 5 November 1918, a temporary Regency Council for the new state, led by Baron Adolf Pilar von Pilchau, was formed on a joint basis from both local Land Councils.

The first head of state of the United Baltic Duchy was to be Duke Adolf Friedrich of Mecklenburg, not as a sovereign monarch, but as a subordinate to the German , similar to other princes or kings of the German Empire. However, Adolf Friedrich never assumed office. The appointed Regency Council, consisting of four Baltic Germans, three Estonians and three Latvians, functioned until 28 November 1918 without any international recognition except from Germany.

In October 1918, the Chancellor of Germany, Prince Maximilian of Baden, proposed to have the military administration in the Baltic replaced by civilian authority. The new policy was stated in a telegram from the German Foreign Office to the military administration of the Baltic: "The government of the Reich is unanimous in respect of the fundamental change in our policy towards the Baltic countries, namely that in the first instance policy is to be made with the Baltic peoples".

Independent Estonia and Latvia 
On 18 November 1918, Latvia proclaimed its independence. August Winnig, the last representative of the German government, signed an agreement with representatives of the Estonian Provisional Government on handing over power in Estonian territory on 19 November. In Latvia, the Germans formally handed over authority to the Latvian national government, headed by Kārlis Ulmanis on 7 December 1918.

The  was formed in 1919 largely by the leaders of the local Livonian and Curonian nobility, who had been the proponents of the United Baltic Duchy in 1918. Concurrently, German officers assumed most of the command positions. In his book Vanguard of Nazism: The Free Corps Movement in Postwar Germany, 1918–1923, the author Robert G. L. Waite notes: "By mid-February 1919, Latvians composed less than one-fifth of their own army". The United Kingdom backed down after it had recognised the gravity of the military situation, and the White Russian units and the  moved on and captured Riga on 22 May 1919.

In June 1919, after taking part in the capture of Riga, General von der Goltz ordered his troops to advance not east against the Red Army, as the Allies had been expecting, but north> against the Estonians. On 19 June 1919, the Iron Division and  units launched an attack to capture areas around Wenden (Cēsis), the  continued its advance towards the Estonian coast preparatory for a push on Petrograd.

On the morning of 23 June 1919, the Germans began a general retreat toward Riga. The Allies again insisted for the Germans to withdraw their remaining troops from Latvia and intervened to impose a ceasefire between the Estonians and the  when the Estonians were about to march into Riga. Meanwhile, an Allied mission composed of British troops, under General Sir Hubert de la Poer Gough, had arrived in the Baltic to clear the Germans from the region and to organise native armies for the Baltic states.

Aftermath 

The Baltic nations of Estonia and Latvia were established as republics.

See also 
 Aftermath of World War I
 
 Duchy of Courland and Semigallia (1918)
 Estonian War of Independence
  in the Baltic
 Latvian War of Independence
 Kingdom of Lithuania (1918)
 Kingdom of Finland (1918)
 Kingdom of Poland (1917–1918)
 Ukrainian State
 Pavel Bermondt-Avalov

References

External links 
 Latvia on World Statesmen
 Baltic flag on Encyclopædia Heraldica
 

History of the Baltic states
Independence of Estonia
History of Livonia
1918 in Latvia
Proposed countries
Independence of Latvia
Former client states
1918 in politics